Samuel D. Betzner (March 1, 1771 – August 10, 1856) was an American-born settler and district constable in Upper Canada. He was born in Lancaster County, Pennsylvania to a Mennonite farmer, Samuel Betzner Sr., and his wife, Maria Detweiler. He married before 1798 to Elizabeth Brech, and died near Flamborough, Ontario.

Samuel D. and his brother-in-law came to Upper Canada in 1799 to join up with other Mennonites from Pennsylvania. The following spring, after wintering in Ancaster, they searched for land of their own. They bought land from Richard Beasley and partners in what became Waterloo County and constructed buildings. They were followed by other Mennonites from Pennsylvania, looking for inexpensive land and continued exemption from military service.

Betzner is recognized as one of the earliest settlers in Waterloo County.

Today, many of Betzner's descendants still live throughout parts of Southern and Southwestern Ontario.

External links 
 Samuel D. Betzner  at the Dictionary of Canadian Biography
 
 Samuel D. Betzner at From Pennsylvania to Waterloo

Canadian farmers
Canadian Mennonites
American emigrants to pre-Confederation Ontario
1771 births
1856 deaths
Immigrants to Upper Canada
People from Lancaster County, Pennsylvania
People of colonial Pennsylvania